The 5th Missouri Infantry Regiment was an infantry regiment that served in the Union Army during the American Civil War.

Service
The 5th Missouri Infantry Regiment was organized at St. Louis in March 1862 It was constructed by Major General Henry W. Halleck's consolidation of 5th United States Reserve Corps, Gerster's Pioneer Company, Winkelman's Pontoneer Company and Voerster's Company of Sappers and Miners.

The regiment had a quiet war, performing garrison duty and patrolling within Missouri. Their first mission was guarding bridges on St. Louis & Iron Mountain Railroad and patrolling in southeast Missouri until July. Company "F" was detailed in the District of Mississippi in July. The rest of the regiment was transferred to Cape Girardeau until November, 1862.

In November the regiment was disassembled. Companies "A" and "I" were transferred to the 35th Missouri Volunteer Infantry. Companies "H" and "K" were transferred to the 27th Missouri Volunteer Infantry. Companies "B," "C," "D," "E," "F" and "G" were mustered out November 22, 1862, ending the existence of the regiment.

Commanders
 Colonel Samuel A. Foster

See also

 Missouri Civil War Union units
 Missouri in the Civil War

Notes

References
 Dyer, Frederick H. A Compendium of the War of the Rebellion (Des Moines, IA:  Dyer Pub. Co.), 1908.
 

Military units and formations established in 1862
Military units and formations disestablished in 1862
Units and formations of the Union Army from Missouri
1862 establishments in Missouri